The 1906–07 MIT Engineers men's ice hockey season was the 8th season of play for the program.

Season

The team did not have a head coach but William Kelly served as team manager.

Note: Massachusetts Institute of Technology athletics were referred to as 'Engineers' or 'Techmen' during the first two decades of the 20th century. By 1920 all sports programs had adopted the Engineer moniker.

Roster

Standings

Schedule and Results

|-
!colspan=12 style=";" | Regular Season

References

MIT Engineers men's ice hockey seasons
MIT
MIT
MIT
MIT
MIT